Transicoeloceras, which is sometimes considered to be a synonym of Catacoeloceras is genus of ammonite that lived during Toarcian stage (Bifrons to lower Gradatus ammonite Zones) of early Jurassic. Their fossils were found in Hungary, Italy, France, southern Spain and South America. It has evolved from Mesodactylites.

Description
Ammonites belonging to this genus have small shells. Coiling is involute to sphaerocone. Rounded subtrapezoid whorl section has maximum width at the shoulder. Umbilicus is deep and venter is broad and convex. Fine ribs were simple, or bifurcating and also had tubercules.

References

Ammonitida
Toarcian life
Early Jurassic ammonites of Europe
Ammonites of South America
Ammonite genera